Life & Style, officially Life & Style Weekly, is an American celebrity magazine, launched in 2004 by the Bauer Media Group. In 2018, American Media, Inc. acquired the US celebrity magazines of the Bauer Media Group.

Although it is celebrity-focused, the magazine is geared towards lifestyle trends, and bills itself on "helping readers incorporate" celebrity beauty, clothing and body trends into their own lifestyle. However, as of 2014 the focus has been more focused on celebrity news.

A German edition was published by the Bauer Media Group from May 2008 to July 2012.

References

External links
 

Bauer Media Group
Celebrity magazines published in the United States
Entertainment magazines published in the United States
Magazines established in 2004
Magazines published in New Jersey
Weekly magazines published in the United States
Women's magazines published in the United States